Jesica Santillan (December 26, 1985 – February 22, 2003) was a Mexican national who died after an organ transplant operation in which she received the heart and lungs of a patient whose blood type did not match hers. Doctors at the Duke University Medical Center failed to check the compatibility before surgery began.

Jesica, two siblings, her mother Magdelena Santillan and her mother's boyfriend Melecio Huerta illegally entered the United States from Tamazula, Mexico, a town 275 miles west of Mexico City, so that she could receive medical treatment. Relatives have stated that the family paid a coyote to get them across the border. During the journey, thieves stole all of the family's money, including Jesica's earrings. The family settled in Durham, North Carolina near Duke University Hospital and successfully raised money for the transplant operation with the help of Mack Mahoney, a local businessman.

Operation 
Jesica, whose blood was type O-positive, had a heart condition (restrictive cardiomyopathy and secondary nonreactive pulmonary hypertension), that resulted in reduced blood perfusion in her lungs. On February 7, 2003, she received the heart and lung transplant at Duke University Hospital. The new organs had been flown in from Boston. James Jaggers, Santillan's transplant surgeon found that blood test results proving that the organ blood type (type A) and Jesica's blood type (O-Positive) did not match just as the surgery was ending.

The procedures that should have prevented such a mistake broke down twice: Dr. James Jaggers, Jesica's surgeon, failed to check the compatibility, assuming that the blood type of the donated organs matched Jesica's. He also failed to verbally confirm that assumption with Carolina Donor Services, the donor agency.

Upon discovery of the error, the transplant team used immunosuppressant drugs and plasmapheresis to prevent immediate organ rejection. The patient was kept on life support after the operation as donor for a second transplant was sought, even as she was racked by a series of seizures and her new organs started to fail. She also suffered from kidney failure as a result of the mismatch.

On February 20, Jesica received a new heart and set of lungs after a new donor was found late on February 19, 2003. However, the trauma of immune rejection had caused irreversible brain damage, and on February 21, she was declared brain dead. Her family was approached by the hospital to determine if her salvageable organs could be donated for use in other transplant patients. On the advice of their attorneys, the family declined. She was 17.

Subsequently, Mahoney, Jesica's benefactor, had to fight the hospital to get it to admit to the mistake, and according to him Duke officials misled the Santillans, who barely spoke English, about the gravity of Jesica's situation.

References

External links
Background Information on Jesica Santillan Blood Type Mismatch
Grief's Gravity: When Jesica Santillan died of a botched heart-lung transplant, Nancy Rommelmann was nearly swallowed by the story February 19, 2004

1985 births
2003 deaths